Alexander Zakirov (born July 8, 1992) is a Russian ice hockey player. He is currently playing with Avtomobilist Yekaterinburg of the Kontinental Hockey League (|KHL).

Zakirov made his Kontinental Hockey League (KHL) debut playing with Avtomobilist Yekaterinburg during the 2011–12 KHL season.

References

External links

1992 births
Living people
Russian ice hockey forwards
Avtomobilist Yekaterinburg players
Sportspeople from Yekaterinburg